The Underneath is a 1995 American crime film directed by Steven Soderbergh and starring Peter Gallagher and Alison Elliott. The film is based on the novel Criss Cross by Don Tracy, and is a remake of the original 1949 film adaptation. The plot revolves around many themes common to film noir, including romantic intrigue, a botched robbery, and a surprise ending.

Plot
Michael Chambers returns home to celebrate his mother's remarriage. Michael had fled his hometown due to gambling indiscretions and had left his wife Rachel to deal with the mess he created. He must now reassimilate into the town, renew his relationships with his family and friends (and enemies) and, most of all, seek out his ex-wife to woo her again.

Michael obtains a job working for his mother's new husband as an armored car driver. He almost seems the perfect prodigal son as he finds his niche back in the community and his way back into his ex-wife's heart. His troubles increase when he and Rachel are caught in the act by her hoodlum boyfriend, Dundee. To get out of this predicament, Michael must concoct a plan to steal a payroll being transported by his armored car company.

Cast

Reception
On review aggregator website Rotten Tomatoes, the film has a 62% approval rating based on 26 reviews, with an average ranking of 6.1/10. On Metacritic, the film has a weighted average score of 69 out of a 100 basing on 12 critics, indicating "generally favorable reviews".

Kenneth Turan of the Los Angeles Times wrote: "What The Underneath lacks is the kind of emotional connection that the best film noirs have. Instead of involving, this film is distancing, too given to admiring its own shiny surface".

Writing for Variety, Todd McCarthy said: "Steven Soderbergh attempts to navigate a tense story of a criminal heist into the uncustomarily deep waters of emotional, psychological and philosophical exploration in The Underneath, with intriguing results".

Barbara Shulgasser of the San Francisco Examiner praised film's director by calling him a "talent", but added: "he still hasn't found his groove. He seems to be searching for the project that will be a match for his talents. He needs to keep looking".

An identical observation of the film was made by Steven Winn of the San Francisco Chronicle. His comment was that: "The Underneath may turn out to have been more of a stylistic adventure for the director than for an audience".

Caryn James of The New York Times put her distaste in the film simply: "Too chaotic to work as a thriller".

The Washington Post critics had mixed reactions to the film. Joe Brown had praised the film, calling it: "Downbeat, laconically funny, arty (maybe a touch too arty), it's simmering, smoldering lowlife fun, like a good episode of Twin Peaks without the self-conscious weirdness". Meanwhile, Rita Kempley criticized the film, writing: "As tales of sex and sinfulness go, Soderbergh's fourth film doesn't deliver".

The film also got 2.5 out of 4 stars from Roger Ebert of the Chicago Sun-Times, and an "A−" from Owen Gleiberman of Entertainment Weekly.

References

External links

1995 crime thriller films
1990s heist films
American crime thriller films
Remakes of American films
American heist films
Great Depression films
Films based on American novels
Films directed by Steven Soderbergh
Films scored by Cliff Martinez
Films shot in Austin, Texas
Films with screenplays by Steven Soderbergh
Gramercy Pictures films
American neo-noir films
1990s English-language films
1990s American films